Helen Audrey Ray Frith (born 12 July 1939) is an Australian athlete.  She competed in the 1960 and 1964 Olympics, representing her native country in the long jump, high jump and pentathlon.  She won silver medals at the 1962 British Empire and Commonwealth Games in both the long jump and high jump and a bronze medal in the high jump at 1958 British Empire and Commonwealth Games.

She was born in Roseville, New South Wales, the daughter of masters athletics legend Ruth Frith, who also coached her.  She joined her mother in masters competition, under her married name Helen Searle she holds masters W60 world records in the hammer throw and throws pentathlon.

Frith was the 1960 Australian champion in the high jump, the 1964 and 1966 champion in the long jump, and five-time champion in the pentathlon, 1960, 1962, 1964–6.

References

1939 births
Living people
Athletes (track and field) at the 1960 Summer Olympics
Athletes (track and field) at the 1964 Summer Olympics
Athletes (track and field) at the 1958 British Empire and Commonwealth Games
Athletes (track and field) at the 1962 British Empire and Commonwealth Games
Athletes (track and field) at the 1966 British Empire and Commonwealth Games
Commonwealth Games silver medallists for Australia
Olympic athletes of Australia
Australian female long jumpers
Australian female shot putters
Australian female discus throwers
Australian female hammer throwers
Australian female javelin throwers
Athletes from Sydney
Athletes from Brisbane
Australian female high jumpers
Australian masters athletes
World record holders in masters athletics
Commonwealth Games medallists in athletics
20th-century Australian women
21st-century Australian women
Medallists at the 1958 British Empire and Commonwealth Games
Medallists at the 1962 British Empire and Commonwealth Games